The 1982 Fort Lauderdale Strikers season was the sixth season of the Fort Lauderdale Striker's team, and the club's sixteenth season in professional soccer.  This year the team made it to semifinals of the North American Soccer League playoffs.

Background

Review

Competitions

Sunshine International Series 
The Sunshine International Series was the first international competition to use the NASL's point system to determine the standings. As such, teams were awarded six points for wins in regulation or overtime, four points for a shoot–out win, and up to three bonus points for each goal scored in regulation.  All four teams faced one another with Fort Lauderdale hosting games on July 24 and 28. On the final day of the competition a double header was played at Tampa Stadium with all four teams in action, followed by a concert featuring country-pop crossover singer, Crystal Gayle. São Paulo FC won the series with a perfect record. The Strikers netted four goals and won one match, finishing third.

Series standings

Series results

NASL regular season 

Regular season
W = Wins, L = Losses, GF = Goals For, GA = Goals Against, PT= point system

6 points for a win in regulation and overtime, 4 point for a shootout win,
0 points for a loss,
1 bonus point for each regulation goal scored, up to three per game.

Results summaries

Results by round

Match reports

NASL Playoffs

Quarterfinals
*Montreal Manic hosted Game 1 (instead of Game 2) due to stadium conflicts with the Expos baseball club.

Semifinals

Bracket

Match reports

Statistics

Transfers

References 

1982
Fort Lauderdale Strikers
Fort Lauderdale
Fort Lauderdale Strikers